Yambunya is a parish of Ularara County in northwest New South Wales, Australia.
The main economic activity of the parish is agriculture, with the Ardoo and the Salisbury Downs Station, and the parish is at 29°55′59″S 143°46′28″E.

History
The parish is in the traditional lands of the Bandjigali and Karenggapa people. The Burke and Wills expedition were the first Europeans to the area.

Geography
Yambunya parish has mainly red soil semi-open Mulga country with stands of box and beefwood running into some harder Mulga stone country. The main groundcover is Woollybutt. The soft soils have the ability to grow a wide variety and mix of grasses and herbages in season.

Climate 
The climate is semi-arid, featuring low rainfall, very hot summer temperatures and cool nights in winter. The parish has a Köppen climate classification of BWh (Hot desert). A minimum temperature of -3.9 °C was recorded in nearby Wanaaring in July 1997.

References

Parishes of Ularara County
Far West (New South Wales)